is a passenger railway station in located in the city of  Matsusaka, Mie Prefecture, Japan, operated by Central Japan Railway Company (JR Tōkai).

Lines

Station layout
The station consists of two opposed side platforms connected by a footbridge.

Platforms

Adjacent stations

|-
!colspan=5|Central Japan Railway Company

History
Tokuwa Station opened on 31 December 1894 as a station on the Sangu Railway Line. The line was nationalized on 1 October 1907, becoming the Sangu Line of the Japanese Government Railways (JGR) on 12 October 1909. On 25 December 1930, the Ise Electric Railway Line connected to Tokuwa Station. This line merged with the Sangu Express Electric Railway in 1936, which was acquired by the Osaka Electrical Railway in 1941, and renamed the Kansai Express Railway. However, this company went out of business in 1942. The station was transferred to the control of the Japanese National Railways (JNR) Kisei Main Line on 15 July 1959. The station has been unattended since December 21, 1983. With the privatization of the JNR on 1 April 1987, the station was absorbed into the JR Central network.

Passenger statistics
In fiscal 2019, the station was used by an average of 412 passengers daily (boarding passengers only).

Surrounding area
Matsusaka City Hall Tokuwa District Civic Center
Mie Prefectural Matsusaka Commercial High School

See also
 List of railway stations in Japan

References

External links

 JR Central timetable 

Railway stations in Japan opened in 1894
Railway stations in Mie Prefecture
Matsusaka, Mie